Elsie Lake is a lake on Vancouver Island located south east of Comox Lake.

References

Alberni Valley
Lakes of Vancouver Island
Newcastle Land District